The Meander River is a major perennial river located in the central northern region of Tasmania, Australia. Until the founding of Westbury in the early 1820s the river was known as The Western River.

Location and features
The Meander River rises in the Great Western Tiers and flows past its namesake town, Meander, through the major regional town of Deloraine, then eastward, where it flows into the South Esk River near Hadspen. From source to mouth, the river is joined by fourteen tributaries including the Liffey River and descends  over its  course.

The damming of the river in 2007 created the artificial reservoir Lake Huntsman. The Meander Hydro Dam provides both electricity and water to the region, and is the second dam on the Meander River.

Recreation
The Meander is a popular trout fishing stream holding brown trout.  The World Fly Fishing Championships organized by the International Confederation of Sport Fishing has selected the Meander as one its venues for the 2019 championships to be held in Tasmania.

See also

 Rivers of Tasmania

References

External links

Rivers of Tasmania
Central Highlands (Tasmania)
Meander Valley Council